Backpropagation through structure (BPTS) is a gradient-based technique for training recursive neural nets (a superset of recurrent neural nets) and is extensively described in a 1996 paper written by Christoph Goller and Andreas Küchler.

References

Artificial neural networks